Dave Malloy (born January 4, 1976) is an American composer, playwright, lyricist, and actor. He has written several theatrical works, often based on classic works of literature. They include Moby-Dick, an adaptation of Herman Melville's classic novel; Octet, a chamber choir musical about internet addiction; Preludes, a musical fantasia set in the mind of romantic composer Sergei Rachmaninoff; Ghost Quartet, a song cycle about love, death, and whiskey; and
the Tony Award winning Natasha, Pierre & The Great Comet of 1812, an electropop opera based on War and Peace.

Career 
Malloy grew up in Lakewood, Ohio and studied music composition and English literature at Ohio University. He began making theater in San Francisco in 2000. Early work included pieces with Banana Bag & Bodice, for whom he has been the composer since 2002.

In 2008 he composed music for Beowulf – A Thousand Years of Baggage, a Banana Bag & Bodice SongPlay written by Jason Craig and commissioned by the Shotgun Players in Berkeley, California. Beowulf received the 2008 Glickman Award and a 2011 Edinburgh Herald Angel, and has played a number of venues and festivals, including Berkeley Repertory's Roda Theatre, ART's Club Oberon, Joe's Pub, and festivals in England, Ireland, Scotland and Australia.

After Beowulf, he co-created and performed in Three Pianos, a drunken romp through Schubert's "Winterreise" (with Rick Burkhardt and Alec Duffy, directed by Rachel Chavkin) that premiered in 2010 at the Ontological-Hysteric Theater, winning a Special Citation Obie Award, and had runs at New York Theatre Workshop and American Repertory Theater.

His next work was Beardo, a Russian indie rock musical based on the life of Rasputin, which Malloy wrote with Beowulf collaborator Jason Craig. It played in 2011 in San Francisco and had its New York premiere in February 2017 in a production by Pipeline Theater Company.
 
For Natasha, Pierre & The Great Comet of 1812, Malloy was the composer, lyricist, orchestrator, music director and performer in the role of Pierre Bezukhov. Comet was commissioned by Ars Nova and premiered there in October 2012, directed by Chavkin; in May 2012 the show transferred to off-Broadway playing in Kazino, a tent custom-built for the piece, first erected in the Meatpacking District and then in Times Square. In December 2015 the show played a pre-Broadway run at the American Repertory Theater in Cambridge, Massachusetts. The show has won an Obie Award, the 2013 Richard Rodgers Award for Musical Theater, the Off Broadway Alliance's Best New Musical Award, three Elliot Norton Awards, eight IRNE Awards, eleven Lucille Lortel Awards nominations (winning three), five Drama Desk nominations, and two Drama League Award nominations. It opened on Broadway at the Imperial Theatre in October 2016 with Josh Groban as Pierre. Malloy reprised his role as Pierre multiple times throughout the run, and was the final Broadway Pierre. In 2022, the show was staged at Malloy's alma mater, Ohio University, for the first time following its departure from Broadway.

Ghost Quartet opened in October 2014 at the Bushwick Starr. After an extended sold out run, the piece transferred to the McKittrick Hotel, home of Sleep No More, and has since played in a number of cities, including Edinburgh, San Francisco, and Cambridge, where it won an Elliot Norton Award. The piece is a staged concept album, about love, death, and whiskey. This was followed by a stop at Youth Musical Theatre Company where he used to work as a pianist for their youth productions. He worked with playwright Krista Knight to write "Don't Stop Me: A New Musical", a "danceathon to the death" centered on the high school experience. While the show was in performances, his next musical, Preludes, a piece about Rachmaninoff and hypnosis, premiered at Lincoln Center Theater in June 2015.

Octet, a chamber choir musical written by Malloy and directed by Annie Tippe, ran at the Signature Theatre Company Residency 5 Theatre in New York City from April 30 to June 30, 2019. The show features an eight-part a cappella chamber choir and "explores addiction and nihilism within the messy context of 21st century technology" premiered in a limited run at the Signature Theatre Company in New York City. It is the first part of his Signature Residency, which will include three shows over the course of five years.

Moby-Dick, a musical based on Herman Melville's Moby-Dick with book, music, lyrics, and orchestrations by Malloy and directed by Rachel Chavkin, ran at the American Repertory Theater from December 3, 2019, to January 12, 2020. The middle section of the show, titled Moby Dick, Part III: The Ballad of Pip was previewed at Joe's Pub back in March 2014.

Malloy lives in Brooklyn, New York.

Theater works

Musicals 
Gogol (2001) (composer/performer; written by Jason Craig and Sean Owens; directed by Meredith Eldred)
Sandwich (2003) (co-creator, with Banana Bag & Bodice)
Clown Bible (2007) (composer/lyricist/Job/Judas; directed by Maya Gurantz)
Beowulf – A Thousand Years of Baggage (2008) (composer/musical director/Hrothgar; with Banana Bag & Bodice)
Haarlem Berlin (2009) (composer; written by Talaya Delaney, directed by Rachel Chavkin)
Three Pianos (2010) (co-creator/performer/sound & video designer; with Rick Burkhardt and Alec Duffy, directed by Rachel Chavkin)
Beardo (2011) (composer; written by Jason Craig, directed by Patrick Dooley)
Natasha, Pierre & The Great Comet of 1812 (2012) (composer/librettist/orchestrator/Pierre; directed by Rachel Chavkin)
Black Wizard / Blue Wizard (2013) (co-creator/composer/Black Wizard; with Eliza Bent, directed by Dan Safer)
Ghost Quartet (2014) (composer/writer/performer, with Brent Arnold, Gelsey Bell and Brittain Ashford, directed by Annie Tippe)
Preludes (2015) (composer/writer; directed by Rachel Chavkin)
Don't Stop Me (2015) (composer/co-lyricist; written by Krista Knight; directed by Jennifer Boesing)
Little Bunny Foo Foo (2018) (composer; written by Anne Washburn, directed by Les Waters)
Octet (2019) (composer/writer; directed by Annie Tippe)
Moby-Dick (2019) (composer/writer; directed by Rachel Chavkin)

Other theater works 

Gulag Ha Ha (2002) (composer/sound designer/Old Timer; with Banana Bag & Bodice)
in3 (2003) (composer/performer; written by j. ries and Jason Craig; directed by Meredith Eldred)
The Sewers (2005) (composer/sound designer; with Banana Bag & Bodice)
Dysphoria (2007) (composer/sound designer; written & directed by Alec Duffy)
Space//Space (2009) (composer/sound designer; with Banana Bag & Bodice)
Five Days in March (2010) (composer; written by Toshiki Okada, directed by Dan Safer)
The Small (2010) (composer/Walt) (written by Anne Washburn, directed by Les Waters)
Murder in the Cathedral (2010) (composer; written by T.S. Eliot, directed by Alec Duffy)
All Hands (2012) (composer/sound designer; written by Robert Quillen Camp, directed by Alec Duffy)
LongYarn (2016) (composer/sound designer; with Banana Bag & Bodice)

Recordings 
In addition to the full cast recordings listed below, rough recordings and demos to most of Malloy's shows can be found on his website.

Official video recordings of Ghost Quartet, Beardo, and Beowulf have also been released online.  A Kickstarter was launched to fund the original cast recording of Octet on June 19, 2019, where it was fully funded in one day. The album was released digitally on November 15, 2019.

Honors and awards 

He is the winner of three OBIE Awards, a Lucille Lortel Award, a Drama Desk Award, a Richard Rodgers Award, Glickman Award, ASCAP New Horizons Award, Jonathan Larson Grant, and New Music USA Grant, a recipient of the 2009 NEA/TCG Career Development Program for Theatre Directors and Designers, and the 2011 Composer-in-Residence at Ars Nova. In 2017, Malloy was the recipient of Smithsonian Magazine's American Ingenuity Award for History.

References

External links 
davemalloy.com Official website

American musical theatre composers
American musical theatre lyricists
Broadway composers and lyricists
Musicians from New York City
Living people
Songwriters from New York (state)
Musicians from Cleveland
People from Lakewood, Ohio
1976 births